Stéphanie Caroline Anne Syms, Lady Edward FitzGerald (9 November 1831) was the wife of Lord Edward FitzGerald, the radical revolutionary and leading United Irishman, and was herself an enthusiastic supporter of Irish independence, scarcely less celebrated at the time than her husband.

Her origins are uncertain. She was described as an adopted daughter of Félicité de Genlis; it is usually assumed that she was an unacknowledged daughter of Madame de Genlis and Louis Philip II, Duke of Orléans. However, according to her marriage registration, she was born in Fogo, Newfoundland (now Newfoundland and Labrador), the illegitimate daughter of Guillaume de Brixey and Mary Sims. and was 
taken to England, where she ended up in the Genlis household.

During the French Revolution, the Genlis family fled to England. By then an attractive young woman, she became engaged to Richard Sheridan, but the engagement was quickly ended. She instead married Edward FitzGerald at Tournai on 27 December 1792. They settled at his home in Kildare and had three children: Edward Fox (1794–1863); Pamela, afterwards wife of General Sir Guy Campbell; Lucy Louisa, who married Captain Lyon, RN.

As the country seethed with rebellion, FitzGerald was hunted by the government and forced into hiding. He was betrayed a few days before the date set for the planned rising he was to lead and was wounded resisting arrest on 19 May 1798. Although his wound was to the shoulder and relatively minor it was left untreated and he died of his wounds on 5 June. Deemed a traitor to the British crown, his estates were confiscated, and his widow was compelled to leave the country to avoid possible charges of treason.

Lady Fitzgerald fled to Hamburg, where, in 1800, she wed Joseph Pitcairn, the American consul to Hamburg. They had a daughter Helen (Born Hamburg 27th April 1803 - Died London 17th April 1896). Although she had been greatly beloved and esteemed by the whole FitzGerald family, her intimacy with them ceased after her second marriage. She remained to the last passionately devoted to the memory of her first husband and died in November 1831 in Paris.

During the Franco-Prussian War, her gravestone was damaged, so in 1880 her remains were brought back to England and were buried in the churchyard of St Nicholas, Thames Ditton, Surrey, with her elder daughter, Pamela (Lady Guy Campbell). The damaged gravestone can still be seen in the graveyard of St Nicholas.

References

Sources
 Dictionary of National Biography, article Fitzgerald, Pamela.

 Portrait in collection of the National Gallery of Ireland 

1773 births
1831 deaths
French adoptees
Edward
French emigrants to Ireland